Hermínio Paiva Fernandes Martinho ComMA (born 23 March 1946) is a Portuguese agricultural engineer and politician, who was the first president of the Democratic Renewal Party (PRD).

Early life 
Hermínio Martinho was born on 23 March 1946 in Tancos, Vila Nova da Barquinha, in the district of Santarém. He studied and did his military service in Santarém.

Political career 
Between 1979 and 1982, Martinho was an alderman in the Municipality of Santarém for the Socialist Party.
In July 1985, Martinho was elected the first President of newly formed Democratic Renewal Party (PRD), a party that had the political support and mentoring of António Ramalho Eanes, then President of Portugal. In the 1985 Portuguese legislative election, under Martinho's leadership, the PRD achieved more than a million votes and won 45 seats in the Assembly of the Republic, making PRD the third political force in Portugal. Martinho was a deputy in the Assembly of the Republic between 1985 and 1991.

In 1986, after Ramalho Eanes ended his term as President of Portugal, Martinho formally invited Ramalho Eanes to be the President of the PRD, giving up his position. Following the disastrous results in the 1987 Portuguese legislative election, Ramalho Eanes resigned and Martinho was again elected President of the PRD in May 1988. In 1990 he resigned from his position after the party's bad results in the local election in 1989.

Between 1997 and 2001, Martinho was again elected alderman in the Municipality of Santarém, this time for the Social Democratic Party.

Awards and honors 

  Portugal: Commander of the Order of Entrepreneurial Merit (Agricultural Merit) (1983)
  Italy: Commander of the Order of Merit of the Italian Republic (1990)
  Morocco: Commander of the Order of Ouissam Alaouite (1992)

References 

20th-century Portuguese politicians
1946 births
Democratic Renewal Party (Portugal) politicians
People from Santarém District
Portuguese politicians
Socialist Party (Portugal) politicians
Social Democratic Party (Portugal) politicians
Living people